Greenock and Port Glasgow was a burgh constituency of the House of Commons of the Parliament of the United Kingdom from 1974 until 1997, electing one Member of Parliament (MP) by the first past the post system of election.

Boundaries
1974–1983: The burghs of Greenock and Port Glasgow.

1983–1997: The Inverclyde District electoral divisions of Cartsdyke, Clune Brae, Greenock South West, Greenock West Central, Greenock West End, Port Glasgow East, Port Glasgow South, and Port Glasgow West.

As first used, in the February 1974 general election, the constituency had been defined by the Second Periodical Review of the Boundary Commission to cover the burghs of Greenock and Port Glasgow in the county of Renfrew. The rest of the county was covered by the county constituencies of East Renfrewshire and West Renfrewshire, and the burgh constituency of Paisley.

Prior to the February 1974 election, the county had been covered by East Renfrewshire, West Renfrewshire, Greenock, and Paisley, with the Greenock constituency covering the burgh of Greenock, and the burgh of Port Glasgow within the West Renfrewshire constituency.

February 1974 boundaries were used also in the general elections of October 1974 and 1979.

In 1975, under the Local Government (Scotland) Act 1973, counties and burghs throughout Scotland had been abolished in favour of regions and districts and islands council areas. Therefore, in 1975, the constituency of Greenock and Port Glasgow had become effectively a constituency within the Inverclyde district of the Strathclyde region. For the 1983 general election new constituency boundaries were drawn, taking account of new local government boundaries.

1983 boundaries were used also in the general elections of 1987 and 1992.

In 1996, under the Local Government etc (Scotland) Act 1994, the Inverclyde district became a unitary council area

For the 1997 general election, the Greenock and Port Glasgow constituency was divided between the Greenock and Inverclyde and Renfrewshire West constituencies.

Members of Parliament

Election results

Elections of the 1970s

Elections of the 1980s

Elections of the 1990s

Notes and references 

Historic parliamentary constituencies in Scotland (Westminster)
Constituencies of the Parliament of the United Kingdom established in 1974
Constituencies of the Parliament of the United Kingdom disestablished in 1997
Politics of Inverclyde
Port Glasgow
Greenock